North Berwick (disambiguation) may refer to:
North Berwick, in Scotland
North Berwick, Maine, a town in the United States
North Berwick (CDP), Maine, the primary village in the town
North Berwick Line, a railway line linking Edinburgh with North Berwick in Scotland
North Berwick Law, a conical hill overlooking North Berwick, Scotland
North Berwick West Links, a golf course in North Berwick, Scotland
North Berwick railway station, serving North Berwick, Scotland
North Berwick witch trials in 1590 in North Berwick, Scotland
Hew Dalrymple, Lord North Berwick (1652–1737), Scottish judge and politician